Not Forgotten is an original novel based on the U.S. television series Angel.

Plot summary

Los Angeles is being struck by a crime wave. There seems to be no link between the victims and their cause of death - burning from the inside out. Supernatural powers seem to be involved.

Angel investigates the deaths, and Cordelia tries to find a band of child thieves. Both searches lead in the same direction - a rich slumlord who is imprisoning the children's immigrant parents.

Angel, Doyle, and Cordelia all have difficulties in L.A., but they realize it's much harder for these immigrants. Angel hopes to help before it is too late.

Continuity

Supposed to be set early in Angel season 1, before the episode "Hero".
Characters include Angel, Cordelia Chase, Allen Francis Doyle, Kate Lockley.

Canonical issues

Angel books such as this one are not usually considered by fans as canonical. Some fans consider them stories from the imaginations of authors and artists, while other fans consider them as taking place in an alternative fictional reality. However unlike fan fiction, overviews summarising their story, written early in the writing process, were 'approved' by both Fox and Joss Whedon (or his office), and the books were therefore later published as officially Buffy/Angel merchandise.

External links

Reviews
Litefoot1969.bravepages.com - Review of this book by Litefoot
Teen-books.com - Reviews of this book
Shadowcat.name - Review of this book

2000 novels
2000 fantasy novels
Angel (1999 TV series) novels